Mirabassi is an Italian surname probably derived from a medieval nickname Mirabasso.  Notable people with the surname include:

Gabriele Mirabassi (born 1967), Italian jazz clarinetist
Giovanni Mirabassi (born 1970), Italian jazz pianist

See also
Bassi (surname)

References

Italian-language surnames